Creative services are a subsector of the creative industries, a part of the economy that creates wealth by offering creativity for hire to other businesses. Creative Services also means a department within a company that does creative work such as writing, designing, and production. It is often a sub-department of the Marketing organization. Examples include:

Design and production agencies
 Studios 
 Ideation consultancies
 Software development firms
Marketing firms 
Public relations agencies
Advertising agencies
Promotional agencies
Branding agencies
Entertainment Industries 
 Talent agency
 Guilds

Like lawyers and accountants in the professional services sector, creative services firms sell a specialised technical service to satisfy the needs of companies that do not have this expertise themselves.

Creative services firms provide creative services to other companies or to the public: they 'do creativity' to order.

Typical business models revolve around selling the time of skilled professionals, either on a project-by-project basis or through a service level agreement, and providing services on an ongoing basis for a fixed monthly fee. In this sense they share much in common with professional services firms but there are also key differences:
 

 Creative services firms tend not to be bound by requirements for professional accreditation
 There are low barriers to entry for new startup businesses

Notes

Business terms
Creativity